The 1998–99 Ohio State Buckeyes men's basketball represented Ohio State University during the 1998–99 NCAA Division I men's basketball season. Led by second-year head coach Jim O'Brien, the Buckeyes finished 27–9 (12–4 Big Ten) and reached the Final Four of the NCAA tournament.

Roster

Schedule and results 

|-
!colspan=9 | Regular season

|-
!colspan=9 | Big Ten Tournament
|-

|-
!colspan=9 | NCAA Tournament
|-

Rankings

References

Ohio State
Ohio State Buckeyes men's basketball seasons
Ohio State Buckeyes
Ohio State Buckeyes
Ohio State
NCAA Division I men's basketball tournament Final Four seasons